KJNY (99.1 FM) is a commercial radio station in Ferndale, California, broadcasting to the Eureka, California, area. It airs a Mainstream Top 40/CHR format billed as "99-1 KISS-FM." Prior to that, it partially aired a country music format as Jenny 99.1 until it adopted the "KISS" branding and went Top 40 full-time on April 8, 2011.

External links
KJNY official website

JNY
Contemporary hit radio stations in the United States
Mass media in Humboldt County, California